Dejan Damjanović (Cyrillic: Дejaн Дамјановић, born 8 July 1986 in Pljevlja) is a Montenegrin football player.

He had previously played with Serbian SuperLiga club FK Napredak Kruševac and OFK Bar in the Montenegrin Second League.

Honours
Lovćen
Montenegrin Cup: 2014

References

External sources
 

1986 births
Living people
Sportspeople from Pljevlja
Association football defenders
Serbia and Montenegro footballers
Montenegrin footballers
FK Rudar Pljevlja players
FK Kom players
FK Napredak Kruševac players
OFK Bar players
FK Lovćen players
Second League of Serbia and Montenegro players
Montenegrin First League players
Serbian SuperLiga players
Montenegrin expatriate footballers
Expatriate footballers in Serbia
Montenegrin expatriate sportspeople in Serbia